This Is...Brenda is the third studio album by American singer Brenda Lee. The album was released on October 10, 1960 on Decca Records and was produced by Owen Bradley. The release was Brenda Lee's second studio album released during 1960 and contained the single "I Want to Be Wanted", which became a number one single on the Billboard Hot 100.

Background and content 
This Is...Brenda was recorded between March 1960 and September 1960 in six separate sessions that took place at the Bradley Film and Recording Studio in Nashville, Tennessee, United States. The album contained twelve tracks, a series of which were cover versions of previously recorded country and pop songs. The opening track "When My Dreamboat Comes Home" was a song originally recorded in 1956, followed by the track "Teach Me Tonight", which was recorded by The DeCastro Sisters in 1954. There is also a cover version of Ray Charles's "Hallelujah, I Love Him So" and "If I Didn't Care", originally by The Ink Spots in 1939. Richie Unterberger of Allmusic called the track "I Want to Be Wanted" to sound neither "country" nor "pop". He also said that the "rock and roll side" of her was represented by a series of cover versions of previously recorded rock and roll songs. Unterberger gave the release four out of five stars, stating, "Brenda Lee's third album was significantly above the average for a pop/rock LP of the era. The orchestrated Nashville production was lush but tasteful, Lee's singing unfailingly committed, and the material pretty strong, even if there was nothing else on the album as strong as its big hit, 'I Want to Be Wanted.' "

This Is...Brenda was originally released as an LP record, with six songs on the first side of the record and six on the opposite end as well. The album has been reissued on a compact disc in both the United Kingdom and Argentina.

Release 
This Is...Brenda spawned its lead single in September 1960 entitled "I Want to Be Wanted", the album's second track. The single became Lee's second and final song to reach number one on the Billboard Hot 100, while also peaking at #7 on the Billboard R&B singles chart and #31 on the UK Singles Chart. In addition, the single's B-side track entitled "Just a Little" gained significant radio airplay and peaked at #40 on the Billboard Hot 100 as well in 1960. The album itself was issued on October 10, 1960 and peaked at #4 on the Billboard 200 albums chart upon initial release, becoming Lee's highest-charting album on that chart. It would also be one of three album's to place within the Billboard 200 Top 10.

Track listing 
Side one
"When My Dreamboat Comes Home" – (Dave Franklin, Cliff Friend) - 2:15
"I Want to Be Wanted" – (Kim Gannon, Giuseppe Spotti, Alberto Testa) - 3:05
"Just a Little" – (Betty Chotas) - 2:26
"Pretend" – (Dan Belloc, Lew Douglas, Frank Levere, Cliff Parman) - 2:53 
"Love and Learn" – (Bob Montgomery, Earl Sinks) - 2:06
"Teach Me Tonight" – (Gene De Paul, Sammy Cahn) - 3:02

Side two
"Hallelujah I Love Him So" – (Ray Charles) - 2:24
"Walking to New Orleans" – (Antoine "Fats" Domino, Dave Bartholomew, Robert Guidry) - 2:31
"Blueberry Hill" – (Al Lewis, Vincent Rose, Larry Stock) - 2:30
"We Three (My Echo, My Shadow, and Me)" – (Nelson Cogane ( Nelson Cogane Fonarow; 1902–1985), Sammy Mysels, Dick Robertson) - 3:31
"Build a Big Fence" – (Chuck Taylor) - 2:28
"If I Didn't Care" – (Jack Lawrence) - 2:43

Personnel 
 Harold Bradley – guitar
 Floyd Cramer – piano
 Dottie Dillard – background vocals
 Ray Edenton – guitar
 Buddy Emmons – steel guitar
 Buddy Harman – drums
 Anita Kerr – background vocals
 Douglas Kirkham – drums
 Brenda Lee – lead vocals
 Grady Martin – guitar
 Bob Moore – bass
 Louis Nunley – background vocals
 Boots Randolph – saxophone
 Bill Wright – background vocals

Sales chart positions 
Album

Singles

References 

1960 albums
Brenda Lee albums
Albums produced by Owen Bradley
Decca Records albums